Järfälla IBK, also known as the Järfälla Spiders, are a Swedish floorball club. They have previously competed in the Swedish top division SSL. They are one of Sweden's largest floorball clubs, with over 500 registered players.

They play their matches in Jakobsbergs sporthall.

Well-known Players
Niclas Olofsson, Goalkeeper (00/01-05/06) Ended his career. Two Worldcup golds (-04 och -06). 37 A-International matches
Joakim Lindström, Forward (94/95-07/08) Ended his career. Two Worldcup golds (-02 och -04). 25 A-International matches
Fredrik Djurling, Center (99/00-06/07) Ended his career. Two Worldcup golds (-04 och -06). Player of the year in Sweden 2008/2009

Sports teams in Sweden
Swedish floorball teams